Blue Bossa is an album by New York Unit, consisting of tenor saxophonist George Adams, pianist John Hicks, bassist Richard Davis, and drummer Tatsuya Nakamura which was recorded in 1990 and released in Japan.

Recording and music
The album was recorded at Music Inn Studio, Tokyo, on December 16, 1990. The musicians were George Adams (tenor sax), John Hicks (piano), Richard Davis (bass), and Tatsuya Nakamura (drums). "A Minor Melody" is performed by Hicks and Davis, with the bassist playing both arco and pizzicato.

Release
Blue Bossa was released by Paddle Wheel Records. Bellaphon were licensed to release it in Europe.

Reception

The AllMusic review by Ken Dryden stated "Things immediately gel during the brisk take of Kenny Dorham's "Blue Bossa," with Adams seemingly energized by the strong rhythm section. The quartet offers a lyrical performance of "Monk's Mood" followed by Sir Roland Hanna's classically flavored "A Minor Melody," which showcases Davis playing both arco and pizzicato bass, backed by Hicks in a duo setting. Adams' hard bop vehicle sounds like it would be a perfect set-closer for a live date. They wrap their studio date with an explosive rendition of "Take the 'A' Train."".

Track listing
 "Blue Bossa" (Kenny Dorham) – 8:40
 "The Everywhere Calypso" (Sonny Rollins) – 7:40
 "I Thought About You" (Jimmy Van Heusen, Johnny Mercer) – 8:01
 "Monk's Mood" (Thelonious Monk) – 8:49
"A Minor Melody" (Roland Hanna) – 7:15
"Blues for Moment" (George Adams) – 5:09
"Misako and Beautiful Shores" (Richard Davis) – 5:17
"Take the "A" Train" (Billy Strayhorn) – 6:59

Personnel
George Adams – tenor sax
John Hicks – piano
Richard Davis – bass
Tatsuya Nakamura – drums

References

1990 albums
John Hicks (jazz pianist) albums